These are the front benches of Micheál Martin from 2011 until the present day.

Initial front bench
This was announced on 31 January 2011. The biggest surprise was the inclusion of then unknown and unelected Averil Power. Jim O'Callaghan, at this time a local politician known only for being a brother of RTÉ personality Miriam O'Callaghan, was also included.

 Micheál Martin - Leader and Spokesperson on Northern Ireland
 Mary Hanafin - Deputy Leader and Spokesperson on Environment
 Brian Lenihan Jnr1 - Spokesperson on Finance
 Averil Power4 - Spokesperson on Political Reform
 Michael McGrath - Spokesperson on Financial Sector Reform
 Seán Fleming - Spokesperson on Public Sector Reform
 John Curran - Spokesperson on Justice and Law Reform
 Niall Collins - Spokesperson on Defence
 Dara Calleary - Spokesperson on Enterprise, Employment & Innovation
 John McGuinness - Spokesperson on Small Business
 Mary Coughlan1 - Spokesperson on Education and Skills
 Willie O'Dea - Spokesperson on Communications, Energy & Natural Resources
 Brendan Smith - Spokesperson on Agriculture, Fisheries & Food
 Billy Kelleher - Spokesperson on Transport
 Peter Power - Spokesperson on Foreign Affairs & Trade
 Marc McSharry2 - Spokesperson on Tourism & Arts
 Darragh O'Brien - Spokesperson on Sport
 Pat Carey - Spokesperson on Community, Equality & Gaeltacht Affairs
 Éamon Ó Cuív1 - Spokesperson on Social Protection
 Mary Fitzpatrick3 - Spokesperson on Housing & Urban Development
 Barry Andrews - Spokesperson on Health and Children
 Jim O'Callaghan3 - Spokesperson on Constitutional Reform and Legal Adviser
1 Then minister with responsibility for this area
2 Then a Senator
3 Then a local politician
4 Not then in public office

2011 post-election reshuffle
Following the 2011 general election, a number of members of Martin's front bench lost their seats, meaning a reshuffle was necessary. This was announced on 12 April 2011.

 Micheál Martin - Leader and Spokesperson on Northern Ireland
 Brian Lenihan Jnr - Deputy Leader and Spokesperson on Finance
 Michael McGrath - Spokesperson on Public Expenditure & Financial Sector Reform
 Seán Fleming - Spokesperson on Public Sector Reform
 Dara Calleary - Spokesperson on Justice, Equality & Defence
 John McGuinness - Spokesperson on Small Business & Regulatory Framework (also Fianna Fáil nominee for Chair of the Public Accounts Committee)
 Brendan Smith - Spokesperson on Education and Skills
 Éamon Ó Cuív - Spokesperson on Communications, Energy & Natural Resources
 Michael Moynihan - Spokesperson on Agriculture and Food
 John Browne - Spokesperson on Marine & Fisheries
 Seamus Kirk - Spokesperson on Horticulture & Rural Affairs
 Timmy Dooley - Spokesperson on Transport, Tourism and Sport
 Robert Troy - Spokesperson on Arts & Heritage
 Niall Collins - Spokesperson on Environment, Community & Local Government
 Michael Kitt - Spokesperson on Housing, Planning & Gaeltacht Affairs
 Barry Cowen - Spokesperson on Social Protection
 Billy Kelleher - Spokesperson on Health
 Charlie McConalogue - Spokesperson on Children
 Jim O'Callaghan1 - Legal Adviser
1 Then a local politician

2011 minor reshuffle due to death of Brian Lenihan
Deputy Leader and Spokesperson on Finance Brian Lenihan Jnr died in office in the early hours of 10 June 2011. Éamon Ó Cuív was named Deputy Leader in his place and Michael McGrath, then Spokesperson on Public Expenditure & Financial Sector Reform, was appointed Spokesperson on Finance. Seán Fleming combined McGrath's previous role with his own, Spokesperson on Public Sector Reform.
 Micheál Martin - Leader and Spokesperson on Northern Ireland
 Éamon Ó Cuív - Deputy Leader and Spokesperson on Communications, Energy & Natural Resources
 Michael McGrath - Spokesperson on Finance
 Seán Fleming - Spokesperson on Public Expenditure & Reform
 Dara Calleary - Spokesperson on Justice, Equality & Defence
 John McGuinness - Spokesperson on Small Business & Regulatory Framework (also Fianna Fáil nominee for Chair of the Public Accounts Committee)
 Brendan Smith - Spokesperson on Education and Skills
 Michael Moynihan - Spokesperson on Agriculture and Food
 John Browne - Spokesperson on Marine & Fisheries
 Seamus Kirk - Spokesperson on Horticulture & Rural Affairs
 Timmy Dooley - Spokesperson on Transport, Tourism and Sport
 Robert Troy - Spokesperson on Arts & Heritage
 Niall Collins - Spokesperson on Environment, Community & Local Government
 Michael Kitt - Spokesperson on Housing, Planning & Gaeltacht Affairs
 Barry Cowen - Spokesperson on Social Protection
 Billy Kelleher - Spokesperson on Health
 Charlie McConalogue - Spokesperson on Children
 Jim O'Callaghan1 - Legal Adviser
1 Then a local politician

2012 reshuffle
Deputy Leader Éamon Ó Cuív soon fell out with Leader Micheál Martin and left his post. While Ó Cuív served on the backbenches the post of Deputy Leadership was vacant. On 12 June 2012, Martin announced another reshuffle but declined to give anyone the position of Deputy Leader. Ten changes were made in total.

 Micheál Martin - Leader and Spokesperson on Northern Ireland
 Michael McGrath - Spokesperson on Finance
 Seán Fleming - Spokesperson on Public Expenditure & Reform
 Niall Collins - Spokesperson on Justice & Equality
 Seán Ó Fearghaíl - Chief Whip and Spokesperson on Constitutional Reform and Arts & Culture and Defence
 John McGuinness - Spokesperson on Small Business & Regulatory Framework
 Dara Calleary - Spokesperson on Enterprise, Jobs & Innovation
 Charlie McConalogue - Spokesperson on Education & Skills
 Barry Cowen - Spokesperson on Environment
 Michael Moynihan - Spokesperson on Communications, Energy & Natural Resources
 Éamon Ó Cuív - Spokesperson on Agriculture
 John Browne - Spokesperson on Marine & Fisheries
 Seamus Kirk - Spokesperson on Horticulture & Rural Affairs
 Timmy Dooley - Spokesperson on Transport, Tourism and Sport
 Brendan Smith - Spokesperson on Foreign Affairs & Trade
 Michael Kitt - Spokesperson on Housing, Planning & Gaeltacht Affairs
 Willie O'Dea - Spokesperson on Social Protection & Equality
 Billy Kelleher - Spokesperson on Health
 Robert Troy - Spokesperson on Children
 Jim O'Callaghan1 - Legal Adviser
1 Then a local politician

2016 reshuffle
Following the 2016 general election and government formation, Martin announced these spokespeople on 18 May. Those no longer serving included Colm Keaveney, who lost his seat, and Seán Ó Fearghaíl, elected to the role of Ceann Comhairle. In a new departure, a number of women were included.

 Micheál Martin - Leader and Spokesperson on Northern Ireland
 Michael Moynihan - Fianna Fáil Whip
 Michael McGrath - Spokesperson on Finance
 Dara Calleary - Spokesperson on Public Expenditure and Reform
 Jim O'Callaghan - Spokesperson on Justice and Equality
 Lisa Chambers - Spokesperson on Defence
 Niall Collins - Spokesperson on Jobs, Enterprise and Innovation
 Thomas Byrne - Spokesperson on Education and Skills
 Timmy Dooley - Spokesperson on Communications, Environment and Natural Resources
 Charlie McConalogue - Spokesperson on Agriculture, Food and the Marine
 Éamon Ó Cuív - Spokesperson on Regional Development, Rural Affairs and the Gaeltacht
 Robert Troy - Spokesperson on Transport, Tourism and Sport
 Darragh O'Brien - Spokesperson on Foreign Affairs and Trade
 Barry Cowen - Spokesperson on Housing, Planning and Local Government
 Willie O'Dea - Spokesperson on Social Protection
 Billy Kelleher - Spokesperson on Health
 Anne Rabbitte - Spokesperson on Children and Youth Affairs
 Niamh Smyth - Spokesperson on Arts and Heritage
 Margaret Murphy O'Mahony - Spokesperson on Disability
 James Browne - Spokesperson on Mental Health
 John Lahart - Spokesperson on Dublin
 Senator Catherine Ardagh - Fianna Fáil Leader in the Seanad

2018 reshuffle
Following a period of underperformance in opinion polls a reshuffle took place on the 29th of March 2018.
 Micheál Martin - Leader and Spokesperson on Northern Ireland

References

2011 establishments in Ireland
2011 in Irish politics
Fianna Fáil
Martin
Micheál Martin